Trunk Records is a British independent record label, which specialises mainly in lost film scores, unreleased TV music, library music, old advertising jingles, art, sexploitation and kitsch releases.

It was founded in 1995 by Jonny Trunk, and has since gained a cult following as a result of the releases of highly influential material from scores for films such as The Wicker Man, Deep Throat, Kes, The Blood on Satan's Claw and George A. Romero's Dawn of the Dead.

Other releases include soundtracks for 1970s UK Television series such as The Tomorrow People, UFO and Vernon Elliott's score for Clangers and Ivor the Engine. As well as film music and jazz, the label has also brought to public attention the lost or unreleased works of electronic pioneers such as Tristram Cary and John Baker, artists such as Bruce Lacey and avant-garde recordings made both by and for children, including the work inspired by radical free thinker and educational pioneer John Paynter.

History
Trunk Records was founded by Jonny Trunk in 1995 in the United Kingdom. Initially, the label was set up as a means to release material from the Bosworth Library archive, the oldest existing music library. Since then, the label has adhered to its mantra of "Music, nostalgia and sex", and established itself as a label popular amongst film and TV fans as well as record collectors.

It has also become infamous for its records associated with the 1960s and 1970s soft pornography such as the soundtrack to Deep Throat, Flexi-Sex (a compilation of flexi-discs from 1970s British magazines), Mary Millington Talks Dirty and Dirty Fan Male, an album based on Jonny Trunk's own experiences organising various glamour models' fan clubs including that of his sister, Eve Vorley.

As well as film music and jazz, the label has also brought to public attention the lost or unreleased works of electronic pioneers such as Tristram Cary, Edward Williams and BBC Radiophonic Workshop's John Baker.

Jonny Trunk has also released his own material through the label, including his album, The Inside Outside. Since 2003, Trunk has been responsible for the rediscovery of composer and jazz drummer Basil Kirchin, by releasing his unknown 1960s experimental jazz and soundtrack work. The label has also been responsible for issuing the UK's rarest jazz album, "Moonscape" by The Michael Garrick Trio. Recent work has included a release of "Noise Art", the recordings found in the studio of late British underground film maker and artist Jeff Keen.

Various Jonny Trunk side projects have included directing the now banned pop video, "Plug Me In", for Add N To (X).

Jonny Trunk is also a regular broadcaster on London's art radio station Resonance FM. Other recent broadcasting has included the BBC Radio 4 documentary Into The Music Library.

"The Ladies' Bras", a single by Jonny Trunk and Wisbey, made number 70 on the UK Singles Chart in August 2007, and re-entered at number 27 in September 2007 after a campaign by Danny Baker and BBC Radio 1's Scott Mills. At 36 seconds long, it is the shortest track ever to chart in the top 30.

Artists

Leona Anderson
John Baker
David Cain
John Cameron
Tristram Cary
Delia Derbyshire
Vernon Elliott
Michael Garrick
Barry Gray  
Tubby Hayes
Jeff Keen
Basil Kirchin 
Desmond Leslie
Sven Libaek
Daphne Oram
Carl Orff 
Mike Sammes
Jonny Trunk
Desmond Leslie
Bruce Lacey
John Paynter

Discography

See also
List of record labels
List of independent UK record labels

References

Further reading

External links
 – official site

 
Record labels established in 1995
British independent record labels